Girgaon Vidhan Sabha seat was one of the seats in Maharashtra Legislative Assembly in India from 1962 to 1978. It was made defunct after constituency map of India was redrawn around 1975.

Members of Assembly 
 1962 : Anant Namjoshi (INC)
 1967 : Anant Namjoshi (INC)
 1972 : Pramod Navalkar (Shiv Sena)
 1978 onwards : Seat does not exist

Election Results

1967 Assembly Election
 Anant Namjoshi (INC) : 23,572 votes    
 A. Pendse (PWP) : 20,198

1972 Assembly Election
 Pramod Navalkar (SHS) : 25,636 votes    
 Khadikar Y. Vinayak (INC) : 24,867

See also 
 List of constituencies of Maharashtra Legislative Assembly

References 

Former assembly constituencies of Maharashtra